William Middleton (born July 28, 1986) is a former American football cornerback in the National Football League (NFL). He was drafted by the Atlanta Falcons in the fifth round of the 2009 NFL Draft. He played college football at Furman. Middleton was also a member of the Tampa Bay Buccaneers, Jacksonville Jaguars and San Diego Chargers.

Early years
Middleton attended Marist High School where he totaled 148 tackles, 10 interceptions, six pass deflections, two kickoff returns for touchdowns, and two blocked punts. He also recorded a school record 103-yard interception return and averaged 27.0 yards on 21 kickoff returns. He was named First-team All-county and All-region honors in 2003 after helping his squad to a 14-1 record and state championship.

College career
As a senior at Furman he started 12 games, making 95 tackles (38 solo), 8.5 tackles for loss, 13 passes defensed, 5.0 sacks and four interceptions. He was a First-team Little All-American and All-Conference selection.  As a junior in 2007 he started at right cornerback in all 11 games and totaled 53 tackles, including three for-loss, three interceptions, and nine pass deflections. In 2006 Middleton  won starting job at right cornerback and helped Furman to an 8-4 campaign that included a third straight playoff appearance. He compiled 38 tackles, including four for a loss, four passes defensed, and a pair of fumble recoveries. He also led the team in kickoff returns averaging 23.1 yards on 25 returns, good for fourth in the Southern Conference. In 2005, he registered playing time as both a backup cornerback and kickoff return specialist. He averaged 22.0 yards on 32 returns and ranked fourth in the Southern Conference in kickoff return average.

Professional career

First stint with Falcons
Middleton was drafted by the Atlanta Falcons in the fifth round of the 2009 NFL Draft. He was waived by the team on September 5, 2009.

Tampa Bay Buccaneers
Middleton was claimed off waivers by the Tampa Buccaneers on September 6, 2009, only to be released on September 10.

Second stint with Falcons
Middleton was re-signed to the Atlanta Falcons' practice squad on September 14, 2009.

Jacksonville Jaguars
Middleton was signed off the Falcons' practice squad by the Jacksonville Jaguars on September 20, 2009.

He was placed on injured reserve on November 27, 2012.

San Diego Chargers
On July 28, 2013, Middleton signed with the San Diego Chargers. He was released on August 30, 2013.

References

External links
Furman Paladins bio
Tampa Bay Buccaneers bio

1986 births
Living people
Players of American football from New York City
Players of American football from Atlanta
American football cornerbacks
Furman Paladins football players
Atlanta Falcons players
Tampa Bay Buccaneers players
Jacksonville Jaguars players
San Diego Chargers players